Centereach is a hamlet and census-designated place in Suffolk County, New York, United States. The population was 31,578 at the 2010 census.

History 
The hamlet of Centereach was first called West Middle Island, but primarily became known as New Village until the early 20th century.  When it was discovered that another village shared the same name, the name was changed to Centereach in 1916. The name Centereach reflects the centrality of the hamlet's location on Long Island, literally meaning "center reached".

Over the years Centereach has progressed from a small hamlet to a primarily suburban community. The population in 1940 was only 628, but the area had grown to nearly 20,000 residents by 1970.

The two earliest suburban developments, which began in the early 1950s, were Dawn Estates and Eastwood Village.

In 1998, the first single-point urban interchange in New York State was opened in Centereach, at Middle Country Road and Nicolls Road.

Centereach, historically a working-class area, has experienced a construction boom in the past decade. As of 2009, the median home price was $335,000. New construction in the Centereach area has resulted in an influx of residents with a higher median income.

Geography

New York State Route 25 (Middle Country Road) passes through the community and is the primary commercial thoroughfare.

Centereach borders East Setauket, Terryville, Selden, Farmingville, Holtsville, Holbrook, Lake Ronkonkoma, Lake Grove and Stony Brook on Long Island.

Demographics

As of the census of 2000, there were 27,285 people, 8,176 households, and 6,998 families residing in the CDP. The population density was 3,429.4 per square mile (1,323.5/km2). There were 8,329 housing units at an average density of 1,046.8/sq mi (404.0/km2). The racial makeup of the CDP was 75.36% White, Hispanic or Latino of any race were 14.08%, 4.98% African American, 0.18% Native American, 2.17% Asian, 0.01% Pacific Islander, 1.36% from other races, and 1.42% from two or more races.

There were 8,176 households, out of which 43.3% had children under the age of 18 living with them, 70.6% were married couples living together, 11.0% had a female householder with no husband present, and 14.4% were non-families. 10.3% of all households were made up of individuals, and 3.8% had someone living alone who was 65 years of age or older. The average household size was 3.27 and the average family size was 3.49.

In the CDP, the population was spread out, with 27.1% under the age of 18, 8.3% from 18 to 24, 32.1% from 25 to 44, 23.3% from 45 to 64, and 9.3% who were 65 years of age or older. The median age was 35 years. For every 100 females, there were 98.5 males. For every 100 females age 18 and over, there were 95.2 males.

The median income for a household in the CDP was $86,445, and the median income for a family was $92,178 as of a 2007 estimate). Males had a median income of $49,167 versus $32,007 for females. The per capita income for the CDP was $23,197. About 3.7% of families and 5.6% of the population were below the poverty threshold, including 4.6% of those under age 18 and 14.2% of those age 65 or over.

Schools
 Middle Country Central School District
 Sachem School District
 Centereach High School
 Dawnwood Middle School
 Three Village Central School District - serves the Hamlet of South Setauket that shares a zip code with Centereach.

Notable people
Don Heck, comic-book artist, co-creator of Iron Man (born New York City, lived in Centereach as adult)
Suffocation

References

Brookhaven, New York
Hamlets in New York (state)
Census-designated places in New York (state)
Census-designated places in Suffolk County, New York
Hamlets in Suffolk County, New York